The Tikar (also Tikari, Tika, Tikali, Tige, Tigare and Tigre) are a central African people who inhabit the Western High Plateau and Bamenda in Cameroon. They are known as great artists, artisans and storytellers. Once a nomadic people, some oral traditions trace the origin of the Tikar people to the Nile River Valley in present-day Sudan. Such ethnic groups were referred to in the 1969 official statistics as "Semi-Bantus" and "Sudanese Negroes." They speak a Northern Bantoid language called Tikar. One of the few African people who practiced a monotheistic traditional religion, the Tikar refer to God the Creator by the name Nyuy. They also have an extensive spiritual system of ancestral reverence.

The current population of Tikar in Cameroon is approximately 170,000. This is a great difference from other enslaved and trafficked ethnic groups like the Kirdi, who still number around 15 million people. This could be due to the high number of Tikar people who were kidnapped and sold into slavery in the Americas. 

The Tikar people of the Northwest are thought to be closely related to the Bamileke people through the Bantu-Cameroon-Bamileke cluster. The Bamum people and other ethnic groups have also asserted their link to the Tikar people through Tikar rulers in the Kingdom of Bamum. However, the Kom, Ndop-Bamunka and Bafut peoples are the only ethnic groups who anthropologists and historians believe have a legitimate claim to Tikar lineage.

There are currently six adjoining Tikar kingdoms: Bankim, Ngambé, Kong (Nkong/Boikouong), Nditam (Bandam), Ngoumé, and Gâ (Ntchi). The boundaries of these kingdoms have remained since Germans colonizers arrived in Cameroon.

Who are the Tikar? 
Today, there is some debate over whether the Tikar should be considered an ethnic group, like the Hausa people, or rather a blanket term for multiple groups, due to the fact that some smaller groups argue that they descend from the Tikar people. While the legitimacy of their claims are strongly disputed, there is a single ethnic group in Cameroon today who are called Tikar and actually descend from the original Tikar people.

Debates are ongoing on the topic of the broader use of the name Tikar/Tikari to identify many villages and towns in north-western region of Cameroon. There are also a number of ethnic groups in the region who claim Tikar descent through royal bloodlines. However, oral tradition and DNA testing by companies such as African Ancestry, Inc. have proven that they are different ethnic groups genetically, with some testees receiving Tikar of Cameroon results and others receiving Bamileke of Cameroon results.

The Bamum people and other ethnic groups have also asserted their link to the Tikar people through Tikar rulers in the Kingdom of Bamum. According to Molefi Kente Asante, the "Bamun and the Tikar are known as great artists creating enormous sculptures of bronze and beads. In many ways, the flow of the culture between the Tikar and the Bamun is one that has enriched both groups. The Bamun essentially adopted many words from the Tikar language. They also adopted words from other people, including the Bafanji, Bamali, and Bambalang." While cultural elements do show similarities between the Tikar and Bamum, cultural anthropologists maintain that those similarities are due to proximity. As the Bamun people are located near the lands of the Tikar geographically. E. M. Chilver and Phyllis Mary Kaberry concluded that smaller groups made such claims of a dynastic connection purely as a political statement.

Groups who also claim descent from the Tikar fondoms include the Bambili, Oku, Kom, Bum, Bafut, Nso, Mbiame, Wiya, Tang, War, Mbot, Mbem, Fungom, Weh, Mmen, Bamunka, Babungo, Bamessi, Bamessing, Bambalang, Bamali, Bafanji, Baba (Papiakum), Bangola, Big Babanki, Babanki Tungo, Nkwen and Bambui. Small communities of Hausa peoples in Cameroon also identify as Tikar.

However, the Kom, Nso, Ndop-Bamunka and Bafut peoples are the only ethnic groups who anthropologists and historians believe have a legitimate claim to Tikar lineage.

Origin 
Oral tradition states that the Tikar originated along the Nile River valley in present-day Sudan. For unknown reasons, possibly war or famine, they settled the Bamenda Plateau in Cameroon, where they built a kingdom. Upon arrival, they were viewed as "Sudanese conquerors," reshaping all of northern-central Cameroon, and became renowned in the region for their ironmaking skills. Professor and social anthropologist David Zeitlyn studied the Tikar origin theories of several historians, including Eldridge Mohammadou. Exploring those origin theories, Zeitlyn stated that "The main question at issue is the origin of the founders of the dynasties and the palace institutions of the different Tikar-speaking groups. How much credit is to be given to claims of Mbum origin? To answer this, a variety of evidence must be considered, including oral tradition and historical linguistics." While some argue that there's no evidence that the Tikar people ever lived along the Nile, others agree and maintain that there's also no evidence that the Tikar didn't. They cite oral tradition, as well as the uncertainty of Tikar origin as evidence, considering there isn't much debate about where ethnic groups originated, as a cause of further exploration.

History 

After entering and settling Northern Cameroon, the ancestors of the Tikar were ruled by Nya Sana, who is said to be the first Fon (or king). Little is known about him and his reign, but it is said that he and his wife birthed the Tikar fondom, or chiefdom. From Nya Sana arose a royal lineage that begot Fon Took Gokor, who ruled from 1186 to 1217. After his rule, there is evidence of female rulers, suggesting that the Tikar may have been both matriarchal and patriarchal at different periods. Princess Wou-Ten, whose real name may have been Betaka, is said to have founded the Tikar dynasty in 1299. She ruled the Tikar people as Fon for approximately thirty years in the early 13th Century. Tinki would eventually become Fon and rule until his death in 1387, which marked a series of deadly battles for the right to the throne. In the end his son, Mveing, ascended the throne and ruled until 1413. However, many believed Tinki's other son, Nchare Yen, was the rightful heir.

Tikar folklore also supposes that Nchare Yen was passed over for leadership in favor of his half brother, Mveing. In an extended telling, Nchare Yen and his legitimate brothers, Mbe and Ngonnso, feared for their lives and fled. They then founded their own separate kingdoms of Foumban, Bankim, and Banso. Mbe founded Bankim, and Ngonnso founded Banso. Nchare Yen is believed to have founded Foumban and named his followers the Bamum people, sometime between the late 14th century and the early 15th century. Both are believed to be named after Nchare Yen's mother, Mfoumban. Foumban would become the capital of the Kingdom of Bamum, one of the largest kingdoms that emerged in the grasslands of Cameroon during the period. Despite the alleged history between the Bamum people and the Tikar people, today they are considered different ethnic groups.

The majority of the Tikar people would later be kidnapped by Fulani traffickers in the 18th and 19th centuries, who were envious of the Tikar's thriving trade deals through iron-working and mask-making. While many enslaved Cameroonians and Nigerians were shipped from the Bight of Biafra, many Tikar and Bamileke were sold up the river to Sierra Leona and Angola, where they were then sold into slavery and forcibly taken to the Americas in the Atlantic Slave Trade, leading to the drastic decline of the Tikar ethnic group in Cameroon. The remaining Tikar kept an oral account of the history and did what they could to keep Tikar traditions alive. 

There are currently six adjoining Tikar kingdoms: Bankim, Ngambé, Kong (Nkong/Boikouong), Nditam (Bandam), Ngoumé, and Gâ (Ntchi). The boundaries of these kingdoms have remained since Germans colonizers arrived in Cameroon. Today, the Tikar people inhabit certain regions of Bamenda Province. The Northwest is composed of the Fungum, Bum, and Kom. The Northeast is composed of Mbem, Mbaw, Wiya, War and Tang. The Southeast is composed of Banso (Nsaw), Ndop and Bafut.

Language 
The Tikar people speak a Northern Bantoid, semi-Bantu language called Tikar, which is hypothesized to be a divergent language in the Niger-Congo language family. The Tikar language (also called Tigé, Tigré or Tikari) has four regional dialects, including Túmú, which spoken in Bankim and Nditam. Linguist Roger Blench stated that the Tikar language has always been somewhat problematic in terms of its classification because the Tikar language is very remote from other Bantu languages in the region and a classical Bantu noun-class system.

Genetics 
Through DNA testing with African Ancestry, Inc., founded by geneticist Dr. Rick Kittles and entrepreneur Dr. Gina Paige, people of African descent across the United States, South America and the Caribbean have been able to trace their lineages to the Tikar people of Cameroon. This genetic testing also showed that the descendants of these stolen people of the Tikar-Bamileke-Pygmy cluster translocated the mtdna Haplogroup L3 to the Americas when they were forcibly taken. As a result, L3 is fairly common in the region today. It is also still prevalent in Central and North Africa. It is believed that the distribution of some of these haplogroups across Central Africa is associated with the expansion of Bantu-speaking peoples. Another study showed that the Tikar are a genetic outlier to peoples of Nigeria's Cross River region, Igboland and Ghana, showing significant differences. Haplogroup L2a1* was also found amongst Central African people, including the Tikar people of Cameroon and the Bubi people of Bioko Island.

Culture 
The Tikar are an artistically and culturally significant people. The design of Ndop cloth print became a cultural marker of the Tikar and Grassland peoples, creating a unique style that made them easily distinguishable from other peoples outside of the region. This intricate design is still used today for clothing, architecture, art and to demarcate royal ritual spaces.

Artistry 
The Tikar are renowned for their highly detailed masks. Their artistry put the Tikar people at the center of trade and politics in Cameroon and made them a force to reckoned with in the eyes of neighboring ethnic groups, especially considering they are thought to be the only people in the region who were skilled in iron-working. Their masks are often characterized by their strongly-defined noses and large eyes. They are also known for their beautifully decorated brass pipes. Along with the Bamileke people, the Tikar are also known for their intricate elephant masks, which became renowned in the town Bali. 

Tikar horns and trumpets play a significant role in spiritual and cultural ceremonies with each design being purposefully sculpted for a specific event. The same can be said for elaborate grassland palaces, which feature hand-carved pillars supporting the roof overhangs, an ensemble of door posts, lintels and sills framing the entrance, as well as the interior doorways facing the open courtyards

Spirituality 
The Tikar people predominantly practice Christianity today. However, there are a small number who practice traditional religions and Islam. Despite the differences between the spiritual practices, the Tikar are known to refer to God the Creator as Nyuy, and the Bamileke people refer to Nyuy as Si. Both groups, along with the other peoples of the Grasslands, believe God requires them to reverence their lineage ancestors. This is pivotal to their spirituality; as they traditionally believed their ancestral spirits were embodied in the skulls of the deceased ancestors and still present. "The skulls are in the possession of the eldest living male in each lineage, and all members of an extended family recognize the same skulls as belonging to their group. When a family decides to relocate, a dwelling, which must be first purified by a diviner, is built to house the skulls in the new location. Although not all of the ancestral skulls are in the possession of a family, they are not forgotten. These spirits have nowhere to reside, though, and may as a result cause trouble for the family. To compensate when a man's skull is not preserved, a family member must undergo a ceremony involving pouring libations into the ground. Earth gathered from the site of that offering then comes to represent the skull of the deceased. Respect is also paid to female skulls, although detail about such practices is largely unrecorded." -Molefi Kete AsanteMuch of Tikar oral tradition speaks of their journey to flee the spread Islam. After they settled in Cameroon, the Tikar people soon found themselves fleeing northern Cameroon to avoid forced-conversion to by Muslim Fulani invaders, who moved southward into Cameroon to take advantage of the lucrative, west-central trade route. The Tikar then migrated southward to what would become known as the city of Foumban in west Cameroon. Once the Fulani followed to the south, war began, forcing some ethnic groups to flee yet again. Others, like the Bamun, remained, hoping to resist Islam. The Fulani conquest was brief and did not result in Islamization, although this faith was accepted by a later Bamum ruler, Sultan Ibrahim Mbouombouo Njoya, in the early 20th century. This created the division between the Bamum and Bafia people, two other peoples who claim descent from the Tikar.

Cultural beliefs 
Surrounded by great grasslands, the Tikar people developed a unique understanding of nature and performed planting rituals to bless seeds and work implements. Other ethnic groups in the region were known to offer animal sacrifices when it was time to plant.

The Tikar also had their own cultural beliefs regarding birthing. It was once believed that during pregnancy, the blood that the woman would normally release during menstruation forms parts of the fetus. This blood was said to form the skin, blood, flesh and most of the organs. The bones, brain, heart and teeth were believed to be formed from the father's sperm. In the case of a son, the masculinity also came from this.

Notable people of direct Tikar descent
 André Onana
 Bryang Kayo
 Chinyelu Asher
 Daniel N'Gom Kome
 Dimitri Oberlin
 Gaetan Bong
 Jasmyne Cannick
 Joel Embiid
Joakim Noah, American basketball player
Jordan Siebatcheu, American football player
 Justin Che
 Louis Ngwat-Mahop
 Pierre Boya
 Thomas N'Kono
 Privat Mbarga
 Roger Milla
 Stéphane Zobo
 Wilfrid Kaptoum
 Yaphet Kotto
 Zacharie Noah

Notable people of Tikar descent in the Americas
Anthony Anderson, American actor, comedian, writer, and game show host
Don Cheadle, American actor, author, director, producer and writer
Ebro Darden, American media executive and radio personality
Quincy Jones, American music producer
Spike Lee, American film director, producer, screenwriter, actor, and professor
Flying Lotus, American hip hop producer
Papoose, American rapper
Sheryl Lee Ralph, American actress, singer, author, and activist
Condoleezza Rice, American diplomat, political scientist, civil servant, and professor who served as the 66th United States Secretary of State
Sinbad, American stand-up comedian and actor
Tasha Smith, American actress, director and producer
Wanda Sykes, American stand-up comedian, actress, and writer
Blair Underwood, American actor
Vanessa A Williams, American actress and producer

References

Additional Reading 
Fowler, Ian, and David Zeitlyn. (1996). "Introductory Essay: the Grassfields and the Tikar". In African Crossroads: intersections of history and anthropology in Cameroon. I. Fowler and D. Zeitlyn, eds. pp. 1–16. Oxford: Berghahn. Available online http://www.mambila.info/Chilver/Xroads/intro.html
Jeffreys, M.D.W. "Who are the Tikar?". (1964). African Studies 23 no. 3/4: pp. 141–153.
Price, David. "Who are the Tikar now?". (1979). Paideuma 25: pp. 89–98.
Boyle, Alan. (2011). "Genes tell a tale as big as Africa". Available online https://www.nbcnews.com/science/cosmic-log/genes-tell-tale-big-africa-flna6c10402890
Asante,Molefi Kete. (2009). Encyclopedia of African religion. SAGE Publishing, Inc. Thousand Oaks, Calif. . pp. 16, 18, 103, 748

External links
Tikar entry at Ethnologue site
Article about Bamenda and Tikar

 
Ethnic groups in Cameroon
Semi-Bantu
History of Central Africa
American people of Tikar descent